Jules Henri Bouckaert (3 May 1870 – 29 April 1912) was a French competition rower and Olympic champion. He was born in Roncq and died in İzmir. Bouckaert won a gold medal in the coxed four event at the 1900 Summer Olympics, as member of the French team Cercle de l'Aviron Roubaix.

References

External links

Henri Bouckaert's obituary 

1870 births
1912 deaths
People from Roncq
French male rowers
Olympic rowers of France
Rowers at the 1900 Summer Olympics
Olympic gold medalists for France
Olympic medalists in rowing
Medalists at the 1900 Summer Olympics
Sportspeople from Nord (French department)
20th-century French people